Komorów  is a village in the administrative district of Gmina Tomaszów Mazowiecki, within Tomaszów Mazowiecki County, Łódź Voivodeship, in central Poland.

History
During the German occupation of Poland (World War II), the occupiers operated a forced labour camp for Poles and Jews at a local sawmill.

References

Villages in Tomaszów Mazowiecki County